David "Doc" Murray (born 10 August 1972) is a New Zealand rugby league coach and former player.

New Zealand career
Murray started his rugby league career playing for the Ellerslie Eagles club in the Auckland Rugby League competition. Between 1993 and 1994 he was an Auckland representative (playing 5 games and scoring 2 tries and 4 goals) and was a Kiwi trialist in 1993. In 1994 he played for the Auckland City Vulcans in the Lion Red Cup before signing with the Auckland Warriors.

It was the only first grade appearance he was to make for the side that year. He toured Papua New Guinea with the New Zealand Māori.

Later years

In 1997 he moved to England, signing a two-year contract with the prestigious Wigan Warriors. However he did not find a place in the first grade side and late in the season he was loaned to the Warrington Wolves. Murray then spent 1998 loaned to the Lancashire Lynx club in the second division. During this time, he also had some trials with rugby union club, the London Wasps.

He returned to New Zealand in 2000, playing one season with the Ngongotaha Chiefs in the Bartercard Cup. During the season he was again selected to represent New Zealand Māori.

Coaching career

Between 2006 and 2008 Murray coached the Otumoetai Eels in the Bay of Plenty Rugby League competition.

References

External links
Statistics at wigan.rlfans.com

1972 births
Living people
Auckland rugby league team players
Chorley Lynx players
Ellerslie Eagles players
New Zealand rugby league players
New Zealand Māori rugby league players
New Zealand Māori rugby league team players
New Zealand Warriors players
New Zealand rugby league coaches
Ngongotaha Chiefs players
Rugby league fullbacks
Rugby league centres
Warrington Wolves players
Wigan Warriors players